The 1955 All-Ireland Minor Hurling Championship was the 25th staging of the All-Ireland Minor Hurling Championship since its establishment by the Gaelic Athletic Association in 1928.

Dublin entered the championship as the defending champions, however, they were beaten in the Leinster semi-final.

On 4 September 1955 Tipperary won the championship following a 5-15 to 2-5 defeat of Galway in the All-Ireland final. This was their ninth All-Ireland title and their first in two championship seasons.

Results

All-Ireland Minor Hurling Championship

Semi-finals

Final

External links
 All-Ireland Minor Hurling Championship: Roll Of Honour

Minor
All-Ireland Minor Hurling Championship